The National Scout jamboree is a gathering, or jamboree, of thousands of members of the Boy Scouts of America, usually held every four years and organized by the National Council of the Boy Scouts of America. Referred to as "the Jamboree", "Jambo", or NSJ, Scouts from all over the nation and world have the opportunity to attend. They are considered to be one of several unique experiences that the Boy Scouts of America offers. The first jamboree was scheduled to be held in 1935 in Washington, D.C. to celebrate the 25th anniversary of Scouting, but was delayed two years after being cancelled due to a polio outbreak. The 1937 jamboree in Washington attracted 25,000 Scouts, who camped around the Washington Monument and Tidal Basin. The event was covered extensively by national media and attended by President Franklin D. Roosevelt.

Following the disruption of World War II, the next jamboree was not held until 1950 in Valley Forge, Pennsylvania. Subsequent jamborees have been held around the country as a means to promoting Scouting nationally. From 1981 to 2010, the jamboree was located in Fort A.P. Hill, Virginia. Since 2013, jamborees are permanently held at The Summit: Bechtel Family National Scout Reserve in Mount Hope, West Virginia.

A jamboree is held for approximately a week and a half and offers many activities for youth participants and the 300,000 members of the general public who visit it. Staff members generally arrive several days in advance, and depart several days after participants leave, depending on their assignments. Subcamp staff stay in the subcamps with the troops, while other staff stay in the staff camp.

First national Jamboree

The first national jamboree was held in Washington, D.C. for ten days in July 1937, attended by 25,000 Scouts, most of whom arrived by train. Region campsites were set up around the Washington Monument and Tidal Basin. The event was covered extensively by radio and newspapers. A press tent accommodated 626 news media reporters, photographers, and broadcasters. Sixty-four news releases were issued and the BSA assisted in the making of 11 newsreels and 53 magazine articles.

The three major U.S. radio networks of the time, NBC, CBS, and Mutual, had broadcasting studios near the jamboree headquarters to produce almost 19 hours of live, on-site jamboree coverage broadcast coast-to-coast. Celebrities also visited the jamboree, including well-known broadcaster Lowell Thomas and U.S. President Franklin D. Roosevelt. While at the jamboree, Scouts also attended a three-game baseball series between the Washington Senators and the Boston Red Sox at Griffith Stadium, as well as toured nearby Mount Vernon.

List of jamborees

The National Scout jamborees have been held at a number of different locations.

Organization

Like the Boy Scouts of America's national organization, the jamboree were originally divided into regions—Western, Central, Southern, and Northeast. Each region was made up of five to six subcamps, with twenty in all. Each subcamp has its own latrines, shower facilities, food commissaries.  Each subcamp contains a number of troops, identified by a three or four digit number depending on the location of the subcamp within the encampment.
The 2005 National Scout Jamboree had 20 subcamps, identified by number and named after famous explorers (e.g. Robert Ballard, Steve Fossett, Joe Kittinger, and Will Steger.)

Effective with the 2013 Jamboree, subcamps are not operated by the regions, but by sub camps that contain contingents from different parts of the country.  Separate subcamps are also maintained for adult staff and co-ed Venturers and international contingents.

National jamborees are now traditionally held two years after a World Jamboree. 2010 was a slight aberration in the schedule (which resumed in 2013) due to the 100th anniversary of BSA.

Troops and contingents

Attending the jamboree is an intensive and expensive process. Considering the logistics of having thousands of youth and their leaders concentrated in one area at one time, the Jamboree Division of the National Council coordinates the entire jamboree process. A normal Boy Scout troop cannot petition to attend the jamboree as participants, instead, the local council establishes a jamboree committee which is charged with promoting and facilitating the experience to their members. Local council committees typically have volunteer members responsible for finance, fundraising, training, recruitment, transportation, touring while en route to the jamboree site, and other functions where appropriate.

Youth members sign up for the jamboree through an application process to the local council, who then places each boy into the jamboree troop. Large councils are granted multiple jamboree troops. Each troop comprises four adults (a Scoutmaster, and three assistant Scoutmasters) and 36 youth in four traditional patrols of eight boys each, plus a leadership corps of four older boys (senior patrol leader, assistant senior patrol leader, quartermaster, and scribe). Scouts must be at least 12 years old on the first day of the jamboree and at least First Class Scouts. After being assigned a jamboree troop, members are given their troop numbers, a participant's patch for wear on the Scout's field uniform, and the council's Jamboree Shoulder Patch. Training and preparation for the jamboree often begins more than a year before the actual jamboree begins. Most troops require the adult leaders to obtain Basic Scoutmaster training, and some require Wood Badge, an intensive management training course offered by the BSA.  Additionally, the Scoutmaster and one assistant Scoutmaster must be over 21, and another assistant Scoutmaster must be between 18 and 21 throughout the jamboree.  The final assistant Scoutmaster may be any age over 18.

Staff

Youth and adult volunteer and professional Scouters provide a number of services to the jamboree by being on staff.  Additionally, when the jamboree was at Fort A.P. Hill, members of the military and government services also assisted with providing services to the jamboree.  Jamboree staff are given a special hat and neckerchief as tokens of their service, plus many of the different staff groups have special patches or pins that are sought after by youth and adult participants. In addition to the regional staff that provide services in subcamps and at the regional activity centers, many other staff members work in areas that serve the entire jamboree. Staff members arrive a number of days before the jamboree begins and usually depart on the same day or a few days later.

The Summit

The BSA announced in June 2008 that locales interested in permanently hosting the national jamboree should submit applications to BSA. Permanent jamboree site considerations included  to be donated or leased for 100 years, water, natural beauty, transportation, ability to also host World Jamborees, and use as a BSA high adventure/training center in non-jamboree years.

Goshen Scout Reservation in Virginia was selected for the new site in February 2009,
 but was withdrawn due to significant restrictions on land utilization and local community opposition.

The Summit Bechtel Family National Scout Reserve in the New River Gorge region was chosen as the new home of the national Scout jamboree in November 2009. The purchase of the property was made possible by a $50 million gift from the S. D. Bechtel, Jr. Foundation. Other donations, including a $25 million donation from The Suzanne and Walter Scott Foundation and a gift of an undisclosed amount from Mike and Gillian Goodrich, as well as other donations, have brought the total amount of contributions for The Summit to over $100 million in under one year. A portion of the  property is a reclaimed mine site once known as Garden Grounds. It is located along the New River Gorge National River near Mount Hope, West Virginia and north of Beckley, West Virginia.

Early announcements from The Summit team at the 2010 National Scout Jamboree, and subsequently on Facebook announced that Venturing would be a part of the jamboree, not just as staff, but as participants. This  marked the first appearance of Venturing at a jamboree, and the first attempt to expand the program to include the senior Scouting program of the BSA since the attempted inclusion of Exploring in 1989.

Jamboree traditions

Patch trading

Most troops that attend the jamboree have a special patch, or series of patches, made especially for the jamboree. Once at the jamboree, Scouts trade their council's patches for patches from across the US and even the world. At each jamboree there are always several hot patches, that everyone seems to want, usually a patch relating to something in pop culture. At the 2001 National Scout Jamboree, one of the most sought after patches were the Marvel contingent patches from Theodore Roosevelt Council in Nassau County, Long Island, New York which would also see 2 more future sets in 2005 and 2010. At the 2005 National Scout Jamboree, popular patches displayed such things as Ron Jon Surf Shop, Master Chief from Halo, Star Wars characters, Super Mario, SoBe energy drink, and the unofficial, yet still sought after, Hooters patches. The 2005 Marvel set from Theodore Roosevelt Council included the first "talking" patch. Its OA Flap set had a chip inside that welcomed Scouts to the Jamboree and included Teddy Roosevelt's signature cheer, "BULLY!" The voice for this (and the 2010 set) were recorded using a pair of Nakamichi CM-700 vintage microphones by one of the 2 designers of the patches. At the 2010 Jamboree, sought-after patches included Marvel superheroes from both Theodore Roosevelt Council and Northern New Jersey Council, Halo, Blues Brothers, the Orange County set (filled with vibrant images of surfers), the Central Florida Guitars (which made music when squeezed), the Great Salt Lake racers, and all sorts of military helicopters and planes, as well as a reappearance of the Hooters patches. Other unofficial patches included a set of Order of the Arrow pocket flaps which included designs from popular internet games, such as Farmville.

Gateways

Each unit that attends the jamboree is assigned to a campsite. In front of the campsite, the troop constructed a gateway to display trademarks of their council or state. Gateways ranged from the very simple to the extremely elaborate. Complex gateways were eliminated beginning in 2013 to match World Jamboree standards of providing standard camping equipment upon arrival, thus allowing contingents to travel by air.

Stadium shows
Typically opening and closing shows are planned that celebrate and promote Scouting brotherhood. 
Attended by all participants, staff, and visitors, crowds can be large in excess of 50,000 persons. Speeches are made by dignitaries. Presidents Franklin D. Roosevelt, Harry S. Truman, Dwight D. Eisenhower, Lyndon Johnson, George H. W. Bush, Bill Clinton, George W. Bush, Donald Trump, Vice President Richard M. Nixon, Defense Secretary Robert M. Gates, First Lady Nancy Reagan, senators, and governors have all attended.  Singers and bands such as The Kingston Trio, Burl Ives, the Oak Ridge Boys, the Beach Boys, Lee Greenwood, and Louise Mandrell, and Switchfoot have performed. Entertainers have included Roy Rogers and Dale Evans, Bob Hope, Danny Thomas, Sgt. Slaughter, and Dirty Jobs' Mike Rowe in 2013. At the 1953 jamboree where comedian Bob Hope was master of ceremonies, he quipped that the assembled 45,000 Scouts, including boys from 23 other countries, were like "the United Nations in short pants". The pre-show entertainment has included performances by military bands, jumping demonstrations by the Army Black Knights, flyovers and the National Jamboree Band.

Military support lawsuit

On April 4, 2007, a US Court of Appeals ruled that federal support for the national jamboree may continue.

See also

 Jamboree Road
 Boy Scout Memorial

References

External links

 2017 National Scout Jamboree, official BSA website
 NationalJambo.Org community for participants, staff, alumni, visitors, and friends
 President George H.W. Bush at 1989 Jamboree (video)
 Harry Truman's address to the 1950 Jamboree
 The National Jamboree Band homepage - How to join